Andrew Lee (born 18 August 1982) is an English retired footballer who made two league appearances for Bradford City between 2002 and 2003. He signed for Aberystwyth Town in 2003 and also played for Wakefield & Emley. He was born in Bradford. He also played for Bradford Park Avenue and in 2010 won the Yorkshire Matchplay golf tournament.

References

External links

Welsh Premier profile

1982 births
Living people
Footballers from Bradford
English footballers
Association football midfielders
Bradford City A.F.C. players
Aberystwyth Town F.C. players
Wakefield F.C. players
Bradford (Park Avenue) A.F.C. players
English Football League players
Cymru Premier players